Sagan om Karl-Bertil Jonssons julafton (lit., "The Tale of Karl-Bertil Jonsson's Christmas Eve") (Christopher's Christmas Mission) is a 1975 Swedish animated short film and television film directed by Per Åhlin, adapted from Tage Danielsson's short story of the same name, telling the tale of a boy who steals Christmas gifts from the wealthy to give to the poor people of Stockholm while working in a post office on Christmas Eve. The short story is also published  in English with drawings by Per Åhlin by Trollboken AB 2018. The film has gained huge popularity in Sweden, and is broadcast every Christmas Eve on Swedish and Norwegian national television. It is also often shown on Christmas Eve by FST in Finland.

The film was dubbed into English in 1987, with Bernard Cribbins as the voice-over.

Plot
14-year-old Karl-Bertil Jonsson lives with his father Tyko and his mother Mrs Jonsson. Karl-Bertil works at the Swedish postal service, sorting and delivering items. One Christmas Eve, Karl-Bertil, who highly admires Robin Hood, secretly decides to sort Christmas presents addressed to rich people into a separate bag and instead deliver them to many different poor people. After being asked by Mrs Jonsson about a porcelain plate meant for Tyko that had been delivered to another family, he decides to be open and honest to his parents about what he has done. This makes Mrs Jonsson cry and makes Tyko seriously upset at him, calling him a communist and sending him to bed early that night. The next day Tyko forces Karl-Bertil to visit all the people whose presents he had misdelivered to apologise. When he and Tyko visit these rich people the following day, they are met with positive reactions from everyone. Karl-Bertil is eventually celebrated as a hero by the various negatively-affected people by being tossed into the air in the midst of cries of ”hip hip hooray”. The short film ends with Tyko proclaiming Karl-Bertil a good person.

Cast
 Tage Danielsson as narrator
 Per Andrén as Karl-Bertil Jonsson
 Toivo Pawlo as Tyko Jonsson, Karl-Bertil's father
 Marianne Stjernqvist as Mrs Jonsson, Karl-Bertil's mother
 Åke Fridell as H.K. Bergdahl
 Catrin Westerlund as Mrs Bergdahl

Criticism
A Swedish debate about the tale's moral nature has sparked every few years ever since SVT started broadcasting it annually, with critics arguing that it is too political and that stealing is not really on par with the traditional Christmas spirit and others defending it. Danielsson himself was embarrassed by too serious analysis of the tale.

See also
List of Christmas films

References

External links 
 
 

1975 animated films
Swedish animated short films
Films directed by Per Åhlin
Swedish animated films
Swedish Christmas films
1970s Swedish-language films
Swedish short films
1975 television films
Swedish television films
Christmas television films
Animated Christmas films
1975 films
Robin Hood
1970s Christmas films
1970s Swedish films
1975 short films